|}

The Prix Corrida is a Group 2 flat horse race in France open to thoroughbred fillies and mares aged four years or older. It is run at Saint-Cloud over a distance of 2,100 metres (about 1 mile and 2½ furlongs), and it is scheduled to take place each year in May.

History
The event is named after the successful mare Corrida, a dual winner of the Prix de l'Arc de Triomphe in the 1930s. A different race with the same title was created at Le Tremblay in 1950, and it was staged each year until the venue closed in 1967. It was transferred to Vichy for the following two seasons, and it was discontinued thereafter.

The present Prix Corrida was established at Saint-Cloud in 1979, and it originally held Group 3 status. It was contested at Évry in 1994 and 1995, and at Lyon over 2,200 metres from 1996 to 1999. It was promoted to Group 2 level in 2004.

Records
Most successful horse:
 no horse has won this race more than once

Leading jockey (5 wins):
 Olivier Peslier – Camporese (1997), Trumbaka (2003), Actrice (2004), Plumania (2010), Solemia (2012)

Leading trainer (7 wins):
 André Fabre – Fly Me (1984), Galla Placidia (1986), Diese (1993), Luna Mareza (1995), Plumania (2010), Armande (2017), Morgan Le Faye (2019)

Leading owner (3 wins):
 Wertheimer et Frère – Trumbaka (2003), Plumania (2010), Solemia (2012)

Winners

See also
 List of French flat horse races

References

 France Galop / Racing Post:

 france-galop.com – A Brief History: Prix Corrida.
 galop.courses-france.com – Prix Corrida – Palmarès depuis 1979.
 galopp-sieger.de – Prix Corrida.
 horseracingintfed.com – International Federation of Horseracing Authorities – Prix Corrida (2017).
 pedigreequery.com – Prix Corrida – Saint-Cloud.

Middle distance horse races for fillies and mares
Saint-Cloud Racecourse
Horse races in France
Recurring sporting events established in 1979
1979 establishments in France